Sebastian Szymański (born 10 May 1999) is a Polish professional footballer who plays as an attacking midfielder for Eredivisie club Feyenoord, on loan from Dynamo Moscow, and the Poland national team.

Club career
On 31 May 2019, Szymański signed a five-year contract with the Russian Premier League club Dynamo Moscow. He was voted by Dynamo fans as "player of the month" for October 2019. On 9 November 2019, he scored his first goal for Dynamo, the only goal of the game in a 1–0 victory over FC Rubin Kazan. It was the first Dynamo away victory against Rubin in 13 years.

On 2 June 2021, he signed a new contract with Dynamo for a five-year term. He was voted player of the month by Dynamo fans for July 2021, August 2021 and November 2021.

On 22 July 2022, Szymański joined Dutch club Feyenoord on a one-year loan with an option to buy for the club. He scored his first goal for the club on 27 August 2022, scoring the fourth goal in the club's 4–0 win over FC Emmen.

International career
In May 2018 he was named in Poland's preliminary 35-man squad for the 2018 World Cup in Russia. However, he did not make the final 23.

He made his Poland national team debut on 9 September 2019 in a Euro 2020 qualifier against Austria. He replaced Kamil Grosicki in the 70th minute. He made his first start in the next qualifier on 10 October 2019 against Latvia and assisted on one of the goals as Poland won 3–0 and secured their spot at the final tournament. He scored his first goal for his country on 19 November 2019 in the last qualifying group game against Slovenia.

Career statistics

Club

International

Scores and results list Poland's goal tally first, score column indicates score after each Szymański goal.

References

External links

1999 births
Living people
People from Biała Podlaska
Association football midfielders
Polish footballers
Poland youth international footballers
Poland under-21 international footballers
Poland international footballers
Legia Warsaw II players
Legia Warsaw players
FC Dynamo Moscow players
Feyenoord players
III liga players
Ekstraklasa players
Russian Premier League players
Eredivisie players
2022 FIFA World Cup players
Polish expatriate footballers
Expatriate footballers in Russia
Polish expatriate sportspeople in Russia
Expatriate footballers in the Netherlands
Polish expatriate sportspeople in the Netherlands